Dirk Dalens the Younger (1657 Amsterdam – buried 24 August 1687 Amsterdam ) was a Dutch painter.

Biography
He was a student of his father, Willem Dalens, and his grandfather Dirck Dalens the Elder, who specialized in landscapes. He died young at the age of 29, leaving his wife pregnant with Dirk Dalens III.

References 

 Dirk Dalens biography in De groote schouburgh der Nederlantsche konstschilders en schilderessen (1718) by Arnold Houbraken, courtesy of the Digital library for Dutch literature

1657 births
1687 deaths
Dutch Golden Age painters
Dutch male painters
Painters from Amsterdam